The national symbols of Scotland are the objects, images or cultural expressions that are emblematic, representative or otherwise characteristic of Scotland or Scottish culture. As a rule, these national symbols are cultural icons that have emerged from Scottish folklore and tradition, meaning few have any official status. However, most if not all maintain recognition at a national or international level, and some, such as the Royal Arms of Scotland, have been codified in heraldry, and are established, official and recognised symbols of Scotland.

Flags

Heraldry

Anthems

 Flower of Scotland is popularly held to be the National Anthem, and is played at events such as football and rugby matches involving the Scotland national teams, and as of 2010 is used for the Scottish team at the Commonwealth Games.
 Scotland the Brave
 Scots Wha Hae
 A Man's A Man for A' That.
 Freedom Come-All-Ye.

Cultural

Flora and fauna

Food and drink

People

See also the 16 people in the Hall of Heroes at the Wallace Monument in Stirling.
For a nineteenth century list of over 600 people see the Biographical Dictionary of Eminent Scotsmen.

See also
Tartan
List of tartans

References